This is an incomplete list of military and other armed confrontations that have occurred within the boundaries of the modern US State of Kansas since European contact. The region was part of the Viceroyalty of New Spain from 1535–1679, New France from 1679–1803, and part of the United States of America 1803–present. A small portion of the southwest part of the state—southwest of the Arkansas River was claimed by the Republic of Texas after the Texas Revolution.

Two wars have directly affected the region, the American Civil War (1860–1865) and the Plains Indian Wars. Kansas was also greatly affected during the Bleeding Kansas period (1855–1861) in which settlers and outsiders fought to determine whether the territory would become a free or slave state.

Battles

References

Citations

Works Cited

See also

 History of Kansas
 Kansas in the American Civil War
 Plains Indians Wars

Kansas in the American Civil War
Battles
Kansas
Battles in Kansas
Military history of Kansas